César Ferrando Jiménez (born 25 July 1959) is a Spanish former footballer who played as a midfielder, currently a manager.

Playing career
Born in Tavernes de la Valldigna, Valencian Community, Ferrando started his professional career with local giants Valencia CF, first spending nearly four years with the reserves. He made his first-team – and La Liga – debut on 26 April 1981, playing the last minutes of the 3–1 home win against UD Las Palmas.

After a further three full seasons with the Che, Ferrando left in 1984 and went on to play professionally with UD Salamanca, CE Sabadell FC and UD Alzira, competing almost exclusively in the Segunda División but appearing in seven top-division games with the second club in the 1986–87 campaign. He closed out his career in 1991 at the age of 32, retiring at lowly Ontinyent CF in his native region.

Coaching career
Ferrando started coaching at amateur level, with his local club UD Tavernes. In 1997 he moved to Segunda División B, where he spent three years in charge of CF Gandía. In 2001, he led Valencia B to a return to the latter competition.

Ferrando was appointed at second-tier Albacete Balompié in summer 2002, achieving promotion to the top flight in his first year and leading the team to safety the following season, which prompted his signing for Atlético Madrid.

After the Colchoneros could only rank in 11th place, Ferrando was relieved of his duties in late May 2005. He subsequently returned to his previous club, for a further two second division campaigns.

For the better part of the next years, Ferrando continued to work in the second tier of Spanish football, with Gimnàstic de Tarragona and Elche CF. He moved abroad for the first time in 2013, being appointed coach at Malaysian club Johor Darul Takzim F.C. and switching to director of football afterwards.

Ferrando returned to Albacete on 13 March 2016, with the team seriously threatened with relegation from division two. On 21 July 2018, he was appointed head coach of Indian Super League franchise Jamshedpur FC.

Personal life
Ferrando's younger brothers, Francisco (1962) and Juan Carlos (1965), were also footballers and midfielders. The former also played for Valencia.

Managerial statistics

References

External links

CiberChe biography and stats 

1959 births
Living people
People from Safor
Sportspeople from the Province of Valencia
Spanish footballers
Footballers from the Valencian Community
Association football midfielders
La Liga players
Segunda División players
Segunda División B players
Tercera División players
Valencia CF Mestalla footballers
Valencia CF players
UD Salamanca players
CE Sabadell FC footballers
CD Olímpic de Xàtiva footballers
UD Alzira footballers
Ontinyent CF players
Spanish football managers
La Liga managers
Segunda División managers
Segunda División B managers
Tercera División managers
Primera Federación managers
Segunda Federación managers
CF Gandía managers
Valencia CF Mestalla managers
Albacete Balompié managers
Atlético Madrid managers
Gimnàstic de Tarragona managers
Elche CF managers
Indian Super League head coaches
Jamshedpur FC managers
Malaysia Super League managers
Spanish expatriate football managers
Expatriate football managers in Malaysia
Expatriate football managers in India
Spanish expatriate sportspeople in Malaysia
Spanish expatriate sportspeople in India